Most of the thirty-eight conferences of the United Church of Christ are subdivided into associations, which are themselves made of local churches. Those conferences without associations include their roles in their own work.

 Countryside Wesleyan  church 
 Bay Association 
 Golden Gate Association 
 Mountain Valley Association
 Sacramento Valley Association
 Santa Clara Association
 Sequoia Association 
 Southern California Nevada Conference 
 Central Association
 Eastern Association
 Northern Association
 Southern Association 
 Calvin Synod —the Synod is a non-geographical judicatory composed of churches which derive from the Hungarian Reformed tradition.
 Central Classis
 Eastern Classis
 Lakeside Classis
 Western Classis
 Central Atlantic Conference 
 Catoctin Association 
 Chesapeake Association 
 New Jersey Association 
 Potomac Association 
 Shenandoah Association 
 Central Pacific Conference 
 Central Pacific Association
 Idaho Association
 Connecticut Conference 
 Central Association 
 Fairfield East Association
 Fairfield West Association
 Farmington Valley Association 
 Hartford Association
 Hartford East Association
 Litchfield North Association
 Litchfiled South Association
 Middlesex Association
 Naugatuck Valley Association
 New Haven Association 
 New Haven East Association
 New London Association
 Tolland Associationj 
 Windham Association
 Florida Conference 
 Hawaii Conference 
 Association of Hawaiian Evangelical Churches (non-geographic)
 Hawai'i Island Association
 Kaua‘i Association 
 O‘ahu Association
 Tri-Isle Association (Lana‘i, Moloka‘i, Maui)
 Illinois Conference 
 Chicago Metropolitan Association 
 Eastern Association 
 Fox Valley Association 
 Prairie Association 
 Western Association 
 Illinois South Conference 
 Indiana-Kentucky Conference 
 Eastern Association
 Evansville-Tri-State Association 
 Kentuckiana Association
 Lincolnland Association
 Northeast Association
 Northwest Association
 Southeast Association
 Wabash Valley Association
 Western Association
 Iowa Conference 
 Central Association
 Eastern Iowa Association
 Northeast Association
 Northwestern Association
 Southeastern Association
 Southwestern Association 
 Kansas-Oklahoma Conference 
 Central Association
 Eastern Association
 North Central Association
 Oklahoma Association
 Western Association
 Maine Conference 
 Aroostook Association 	
 Cumberland Association 
 Franklin Association 
 Hancock-Waldo Association 
 Kennebec Valley Association 	
 Lincoln Association 
 Oxford Union Association 	
 Penobscot-Piscataquis Association 
 Washington Association 
 York Association 
 Massachusetts Conference 
 Barnstable Association 
 Berkshire Association 
 Central Association 
 Franklin Association 
 Hampden Association 
 Hampshire Association 
 Metropolitan Boston Association
 Northeast Association 
 Old Colony Association 
 Pilgrim Association 
(Andover and Essex Associations voted to merge on June 7, 2014, which took effect March 19, 2015.)
 Michigan Conference 
 Covenant Association 
 Detroit Metropolitan Association
 Eastern Association
 Grand West Association 
 Southwest Association
 United Northern Association
 Minnesota Conference 
 Missouri Mid-South Conference 
 Eastern Association 
 St. Louis Association 
 Western Association 
 Montana-Northern Wyoming Conference 
 Eastern Association
 Western Association
 Yellowstone Association
 Nebraska Conference 
 Lincoln Association
 Northeastern Association
 Omaha Association
 Pioneer Association
 South Central Association
 Western Association
 New Hampshire Conference 
 Carroll-Strafford Association
 Cheshire Association
 Grafton-Orange Association
 Hillsborough Association
 Merrimack Association
 North Country Association
 Rockingham Association
 Sullivan Association 
 New York Conference 
 Black River/St. Lawrence Association
 Essex Association
 Genesee Valley Association
 Hudson/Mohawk Association
 Metropolitan Association
 Reformed Association
 Suffolk Association
 Oneida Association
 Susquehanna Association
 Western Association
 Northern Plains Conference 
 Missouri Valley Association
 Eastern Association
 Canadian Association (inactive)
 Ohio Conference 
 Central Southeast Ohio Association 
 Eastern Ohio Association 
 Northwestern Ohio Association 
 Southwest Ohio Northern Kentucky Association 
 Western Reserve Association 
 Pacific Northwest Conference 
 Penn Central Conference 
 Central Association
 Gettysburg Association
 Harrisburg Association
 Lancaster Association
 Lebanon Association
 Mercersburg Association
 Northern Association 
 York Association 
 Penn Northeast Conference 
 Pennsylvania Southeast Conference 
 East Berks Association
 Heidelberg Association
 North Penn Association
 Philadelphia Association
 Reading Association
 Schuylkill Association
 Ursinus Association
 Penn West Conference 
 Clarion Association
 Juniata Association
 Lake Erie Association
 Pittsburgh Association
 Somerset Association
 Westmoreland Association
 Puerto Rico Conference—withdrew from the UCC on June 10, 2006; some congregations may remain affiliated and form a new body at a later time.
 Rhode Island Conference 
 Rocky Mountain Conference 
 Metropolitan Denver Association 
 Platte Valley Association
 Southeastern Association
 Intermountain Association
 Western Colorado Association 
 South Central Conference 
 Brazos Association
 Houston Association 
 New Orleans Association
 North Texas Association
 South Texas Association 
 South Dakota Conference 
 Black Hills Association
 Dakota Association
 Oahe Association
 Prairie-Lakes Association
 Two Rivers Association
 Southeast Conference 
 Alabama-Tennessee Association
 East Alabama-West Georgia Association
 Southern Conference 
 Eastern North Carolina Association 
 Eastern Virginia Association 
 Western North Carolina Association 
 Southwest Conference 
 Vermont Conference 
 Addison Association
 Champlain Association
 Grafton-Orange Association
 Northeast Association
 Southwest Association
 Washington Association
 Windham-Union Association
 Windsor-Orange Association 
 Wisconsin Conference 
 Northeast Association 
 Northwest Association 
 Southeast Association 
 Southwest Association

See also
Middle judicatory

United Church of Christ